#GoBackModi is a hashtag and movement that protests and voices opposition against the Indian prime minister Narendra Modi's visits to various places, primarily throughout India, and sporadically throughout the world. The hashtag first gained popularity on 12 April 2018, when Modi visited Chennai, Tamil Nadu to inaugurate a defence exhibition, and has been especially popular in the state ever since. However, the movement's first instance was a Malayalam language variation of the hashtag named #PoMoneModi, and has been adopted since May 2016, when Modi was campaigning for elections in Kerala.

The hashtag has been prominently used by the DMK, the current ruling party in the state of Tamil Nadu, and also by notable people like Meena Kandasamy, Oviya to express dissent against Modi's visits.  The movement has also had on the ground protests, in places surrounding the areas that Modi visits.

Background 
Narendra Modi was elected as the Prime Minister of India in the 2014 Indian general election. Along the span of his tenure, Modi and his party, the BJP's statements and decisions were increasingly being seen as opposing and neutralizing all dissent towards the party and its conservative ideologies.

Movements 
Two years after being elected as the prime minister, Modi visited the state of Kerala in May 2016, to campaign for the BJP in the 2016 Kerala Legislative Assembly election. During a campaign rally, Modi gave a speech in which he compared the infant mortality rate of Kerala to that of Somalia. Kerala is one of the most religiously heterogeneous states in India, and the Kerala model has consistently been praised as one of the most socially developed states. Consequently, Modi's statement criticising Kerala's social indicators immediately drew strong reactions from major political figures, including the Kerala chief minister at the time, Oommen Chandy, who demanded that Modi withdraw his remarks. The BJP won one seat that election. As another consequence of Modi's remark, a social media campaign took off, making use of the hashtag #PoMoneModi, loosely translating to "Go Back Modi". The hashtag is also a reference to the popular punchline "Nee Po Mone Dinesha" from the film Narasimham.

On 12 April 2018, Modi visited Chennai to inaugurate a defence expo organised by the Defence Exhibition Organisation. The day Modi arrived in Chennai, mass protests erupted, some of which were spearheaded by the DMK president and current Tamil Nadu chief minister, M. K. Stalin. The protests were characterized by black insignia, a colour associated with the Dravidian ideology in the state. Simultaneously, social media campaigns erupted making use of the hashtag #GoBackModi for the first time. The hashtag became the top worldwide trend on Twitter that day, and has been embraced to demonstrate protests every time Modi visits Tamil Nadu, ever since.

Apart from being repeatedly embraced by the South Indian states of Kerala and Tamil Nadu, the movement has also seen support in Karnataka, Andhra Pradesh, Punjab, West Bengal, and also the Northeastern states of Arunachal Pradesh, Assam and Tripura among others. Internationally, Modi witnessed protests and opposition from Bangladesh citizens when he visited the country in 2021 to celebrate the 50th anniversary of its independence from Pakistan.

Reactions 
The primary target of the movement, the BJP, has claimed that the hashtag is inorganic and has been propagated by users from Pakistan in the past. A BJP member also filed a case on Tamil actor Oviya for using the hashtag.

References 

Hashtags
Narendra Modi
Indian political slogans
2018 in Internet culture
Internet memes introduced from India
Internet memes introduced in 2016
Internet memes introduced in 2018
2016 establishments in India
2018 establishments in India